The Sioux Empire Fair is a fair held annually each summer in Sioux Falls at the W. H. Lyon Fairgrounds. Attendance at the 2014 fair was 280,985.

The Sioux Empire Fair includes carnival rides, fair food, livestock shows, horse shows, and art competitions daily. Special themed days feature deals for senior citizens, farmers, daycares, families, and more. Among the free family entertainments are magic shows, hands-on activities, Old Mac Donald's Farm, The Pipestone Discovery Barn, music, and game vendors. Pro rodeo and local, regional, and national headline concerts are featured and are free with paid fair admission. The 76th Annual Sioux Empire Fair will be held on July 31-August 9, 2015 with the theme being Meet Me at the Fair.

References

External links
 www.SiouxEmpireFair.com Sioux Empire Fair website

Festivals in South Dakota
Culture of Sioux Falls, South Dakota
Tourist attractions in Sioux Falls, South Dakota